Tritantri or Tritantrika vina/veena can refer to two different instruments:

A medieval stick zither with 3 strings.

As a term for small practice sitar malaproped  in the 19th century by Raja Sir Surindo Mohun Tagore from Calcutta (1840-1914) 

 
This small practice sitar was built from a single piece of wood, about 100 cm in length. It had a small resonator, about 20 cm in diameter, carved of the same log. The neck was topped with 16 metal frets set in wax on wooden tracks, and a tuning box with three pegs.

References

External links
Museum Philharmonie de Paris
Europeana collection

Indian musical instruments
String instruments